This article is a list of political parties in Finland, which includes Finland's national-level political parties and excludes local and provincial parties (such as the parties of Åland). A party is defined as a political association whose existence is recorded in the Ministry of Justice's party register.

Finland has a multi-party system. Coalition governments which comprise a majority of seats in the Parliament of Finland are the norm. Those parties which are not in government are called the opposition. Due to the lack of an electoral threshold, many parties are usually represented in Parliament. As a result, it is all but impossible for one party to win a majority. Additionally, the socialist and non-socialist blocs usually cannot win enough seats between them to form a governing coalition on their own. Most Finnish governments, particularly since World War II, have thus been grand coalitions comprising parties stretching across the political spectrum.

Parties work in parliamentary groups (eduskuntaryhmät), usually voting with party discipline, which is however not absolute.

Parties are composed of local chapters based in municipalities. In municipalities, which are fundamental administrative units of the country, parties hold seats in the municipal councils, but often have to compete for them with local non-party groups.

Finnish law states that a political association which fulfills certain conditions is eligible to become a political party free of charge. Among these conditions are:

 that the primary purpose of the association is to affect governmental affairs,
 that it has received at least 5,000 votes in any parliamentary, municipal, or European Parliament election,
 that the association's rules secure the following of democratic principles in its decision making and activities,
 and that it has a general program based on these rules which expresses the association's principles and goals regarding its actions in governmental affairs.

A registered party may nominate candidates in any national and local elections, and a party that is represented in parliament is entitled to a government subsidy relative to its number of seats. To qualify as a registered party, an association must have bylaws guaranteeing democratic internal organization and must be able to present 5,000 signatures from supporters who are eligible to vote. A party that fails to win a single seat in two consecutive parliamentary elections is stricken from the register but may apply again. (In contrast, a voluntary association has a requirement of 20,000 supporters and is not eligible for party subsidy.)

Parliamentary parties

Extra-parliamentary parties

Registered 
Those parties that have received neither a seat in the Parliament of Finland nor in the European Parliament, but which are registered political parties, are listed below.

Unregistered

Historical parties

Parliamentary historical parties

Extra-parliamentary historical parties 

 Swedish party (Ruotsalainen puolue) 1870–1906
 Liberal party (Liberaalinen puolue) 1880–1885
 Finnish Active Resistance Party (Suomen aktiivinen vastustuspuolue) 1904–1908
 National Workers' Party (Kansallinen Työväenpuolue) 1917–?
 Socialist Party of Work (Sosialistinen Työpuolue) 1917–1919
 Peasant People's Party (Talonpoikaiskansan puolue) 1924–1933
 Farmers' Party (Maanviljelijäin Puolue) 1927–1929
 United Front (Yhteisrintama) 193?–1940
 New Finnish Party (Uusi Suomalainen Puolue) 1932–1945
 Finnish Socialist Party (Suomalaissosialistinen Puolue) 1932–1937
 Patriotic People's Party (Isänmaallinen Kansanpuolue) 1932–1933
 Finnish People's Organisation (Suomen Kansan Järjestö) 1933–1936
 Finnish-Socialist Workers' Party (Suomalaissosialistinen Työväen Puolue) 1934–1944
 Finnish Labor Front (Suomen Työrintama) 1936–1939
 Party of Finnish National Work (Suomalais-Kansallisen Työn Puolue) 1939–?
 Finnish National Socialist Labor Organisation (Suomen Kansallissosialistinen Työväenpuolue) 1940–1943
 Neo-Socialist Party (Uus-sosialistinen puolue) 1940–1945
 Organisation of National Socialists (Kansallissosialistien Järjestö) 1940–1944
 National Socialists of Finland (Suomen Kansallissosialistit) 1941–1944
 Radical People's Party (Radikaalinen Kansanpuolue) 1944–1951
 Independent Middle Class (Itsenäinen keskiluokka) 1949–1951
 Finnish People's Party (Suomalainen kansanpuolue) 1950s
 Independence Party (Itsenäisyyspuolue) 1960s
 Party Organisation of Finnish Entrepreneurs (Suomen Yksityisyrittäjäin Puoluejärjestö) 1972–1979
 Socialist Workers' Party (Sosialistinen Työväenpuolue) 1973–1990
 Pensioners' Party of Finland (Suomen Eläkeläisten Puolue) 1985–1999
 Joint Responsibility Party (Yhteisvastuu puolue) 1987–2007
 Senior Citizens' Party of Finland (Suomen Senioripuolue), 1990–2014
 Women's Party (Naisten puolue) 1990–1995
 Party of Humanity (Ihmisyydenpuolue) 1991–1995
 Finnish People's Blue-whites (Suomen Kansan Sinivalkoiset, SKS) 1993–2010
 Patriotic People's Movement (Isänmaallinen kansanliike), 1993–2010
 Natural Law Party (Luonnonlain puolue) 1994–2001
 Workers' Party of Finland (Suomen Työväenpuolue) 1999–2018
 Forces for Change in Finland (Muutosvoimat Suomi) 2002–2007
 For the Poor (Köyhien Asialla) 2002–2015
 Blue and White Front (Sinivalkoinen Rintama) 2009–2015

See also

 Parliament of Finland
 Government of Finland
 President of Finland
 Elections in Finland
 Politics of Finland
 List of political parties in Åland
 List of ruling political parties by country

References

External links
 NSD: European Election Database - Political parties of Finland

Finland
 
Political parties
Political parties